William Cage (28 March 1666 – 21 January 1738) was an English Tory politician who sat in the House of Commons of England from 1702 to 1705 and in the House of Commons of Great Britain from 1710 to 1715.

Cage was the son of William Cage, lawyer of Hollingbourne, Kent and his wife Cicely Culpeper, daughter of Sir Cheney Culpeper and Elizabeth Stede. His father and grandfather died in 1676 and 1677 and he succeeded to his grandfather's estate at Milgate Park. He was High Sheriff of Kent in 1694 but was fired from the justice's bench in December 1695 and arrested in February 1696 for betraying confidants. Nevertheless, he became a Deputy Lieutenant and a colonel of the militia by 1701.

At the 1701 election, Cage stood for parliament at Rochester but was unsuccessful as a result of a smear campaign under the allegations of disloyalty. However, he was elected Member of Parliament (MP) for Rochester in 1702 and sat until 1705 when following his defeat he was described as a "violent man". He was re-elected for Rochester again in 1710 in a Tory landslide and sat until 1715 when he declined to stand.

Personal life 
Cage married Catherine before 1690 and had three sons and four daughters.

Cage died at age 71, after a long retirement from politics.

References

English MPs 1702–1705
1666 births
1738 deaths
British MPs 1710–1713
British MPs 1713–1715
High Sheriffs of Kent
People from Rochester, Kent
Members of the Parliament of Great Britain for English constituencies
People from Hollingbourne